Estadio Jaime Morón León formerly known as Estadio Pedro de Heredia is a multi-use stadium in Cartagena de Indias,  Colombia. It is currently used mostly for football matches. The stadium has a capacity of 16,068 people and was built in 1958. Real Cartagena plays its home games at this stadium.

References

Jaime Moron Leon
Jaime Moron Leon
Buildings and structures in Cartagena, Colombia